These are the official results of the men's 100 metres event at the 2003 IAAF World Championships in Paris, France. There were a total number of 79 participating athletes, with ten qualifying heats, four quarter-finals, two semi-finals and the final held on Monday 25 August 2003.

At 18 years, 318 days old, silver medallist Darrel Brown became the youngest ever world medallist for the men's 100 m.

Final

Semi-final
Held on Monday 2003-08-25

Quarter-finals
Held on Sunday 2003-08-24

Heats
Held on Sunday 2003-08-25

See also
Athletics at the 2003 Pan American Games - Men's 100 metres

References
General
 Full 100 metres results. IAAF. Retrieved on 2009-10-02.
Specific

H
100 metres at the World Athletics Championships